The Chad National Army ( Al-Jaish al-Watani at-Tshadi, ANT) consists of the five Defence and Security Forces listed in Article 185 of the Chadian Constitution that came into effect on 4 May 2018.  These are the National Army ((including Ground Forces, and Air Force), the National Gendarmerie), the National Police, the National and Nomadic Guard (GNNT) and the Judicial Police. Article 188 of the Constitution specifies that National Defence is the responsibility of the Army, Gendarmerie and GNNT, whilst the maintenance of public order and security is the responsibility of the Police, Gendarmerie and GNNT.

History

From independence through the period of the presidency of Félix Malloum (1975–79), the official national army was known as the Chadian Armed Forces (Forces Armées Tchadiennes—FAT). Composed mainly of soldiers from southern Chad, FAT had its roots in the army recruited by France and had military traditions dating back to World War I. FAT lost its status as the legal state army when Malloum's civil and military administration disintegrated in 1979. Although it remained a distinct military body for several years, FAT was eventually reduced to the status of a regional army representing the south.

After Habré consolidated his authority and assumed the presidency in 1982, his victorious army, the Armed Forces of the North (Forces Armées du Nord—FAN), became the nucleus of a new national army. The force was officially constituted in January 1983, when the various pro-Habré contingents were merged and renamed the Chadian National Armed Forces (Forces Armées Nationales Tchadiennes—FANT).

The Military of Chad was dominated by members of Toubou, Zaghawa, Kanembou, Hadjerai, and Massa ethnic groups during the presidency of Hissène Habré. Later Chadian president Idriss Déby revolted and fled to the Sudan, taking with him many Zaghawa and Hadjerai soldiers in 1989.

Chad's armed forces numbered about 36,000 at the end of the Habré regime, but swelled to an estimated 50,000 in the early days of Déby's rule. With French support, a reorganization of the armed forces was initiated early in 1991 with the goal of reducing its numbers and making its ethnic composition reflective of the country as a whole. Neither of these goals was achieved, and the military is still dominated by the Zaghawa.

In 2004, the government discovered that many of the soldiers it was paying did not exist and that there were only about 19,000 soldiers in the army, as opposed to the 24,000 that had been previously believed. Government crackdowns against the practice are thought to have been a factor in a failed military mutiny in May 2004.

The current conflict, in which the Chadian military is involved, is the civil war against Sudanese-backed rebels. Chad successfully manages to repel the rebel movements, but recently, with some losses (see Battle of N'Djamena (2008)). The army uses its artillery systems and tanks, but well-equipped insurgents have probably managed to destroy over 20 of Chad's 60 T-55 tanks, and probably shot down a Mi-24 Hind gunship, which bombed enemy positions near the border with Sudan. In November 2006 Libya supplied Chad with four Aermacchi SF.260W light attack planes. They are used to strike enemy positions by the Chadian Air Force, but one was shot down by rebels. During the last battle of N'Djamena gunships and tanks have been put to good use, pushing armed militia forces back from the Presidential palace. The battle impacted the highest levels of the army leadership, as Daoud Soumain, its Chief of Staff, was killed.

On March 23, 2020 a Chadian army base was ambushed by fighters of the jihadist insurgent group Boko Haram. The army lost 92 servicemen in one day. In response, President Déby launched an operation dubbed "Wrath of Boma". According to Canadian counter terrorism St-Pierre, numerous external operations and rising insecurity in the neighboring countries had recently overstretched the capacities of the Chadian armed forces.

After the death of President Idriss Déby on 19 April 2021 in fighting with FACT rebels, his son General Mahamat Idriss Déby was named interim president and head of the armed forces.

Budget
The CIA World Factbook estimates the military budget of Chad to be 4.2% of GDP as of 2006.. Given the then GDP ($7.095 bln) of the country, military spending was estimated to be about $300 million. This estimate however dropped after the end of the Civil war in Chad (2005–2010) to 2.0% as estimated by the World Bank for the year 2011. There aren't any more recent estimates available.

External deployments
UN missions
non-UN missions
Chad participated in a peace mission under the authority of African Union in the neighboring Central African Republic to try to pacify the recent conflict, but has chosen to withdraw after its soldiers were accused of shooting into a marketplace, unprovoked, according to BBC.

See also
 Chad Air Force
 Chadian Armed Forces
 Chadian National Armed Forces
 Nomad and National Guard

Notes

References 
R. Hure "L'Armee d' Afrique 1830-1962"
John Keegan "World Armies" 
"Economic Development and the Libya-Chad Wars," Chapter 12 in Kenneth Pollack, Armies of Sand: The Past, Present, and Future of Arab Military Effectiveness, Oxford University Press, New York, 2019.

 

Pages à modifier :
https://en.wikip

 
Chadian Civil War (2005–2010)